Mary Joe Fernández and Martina Hingis were the defending champions but did not compete that year.

Conchita Martínez and Patricia Tarabini won in the final 3–6, 6–4, 6–4 against Lisa Raymond and Rennae Stubbs.

Seeds
Champion seeds are indicated in bold text while text in italics indicates the round in which those seeds were eliminated. The top four seeded teams received byes into the second round.

Draw

Final

Top half

Bottom half

External links
 1998 Family Circle Cup Doubles draw

Charleston Open
Family Circle Cup